Atalaya   is a corregimiento in Atalaya District, Veraguas Province, Panama with a population of 4,924 as of 2010. It is the seat of Atalaya District. Its population as of 1990 was 5,737; its population as of 2000 was 4,449.

References

Corregimientos of Veraguas Province